The 1998 Kent State Golden Flashes football team was an American football team that represented Kent State University in the Mid-American Conference (MAC) during the 1998 NCAA Division I-A football season. In their first season under head coach Dean Pees, the Golden Flashes compiled a 0–11 record (0–8 against MAC opponents), finished in last place in the MAC East, and were outscored by all opponents by a combined total of 454 to 149.

The team's statistical leaders included Demarlo Rozier with 621 rushing yards, Jose Davis with 2,046 passing yards, and Eugene Baker with 685 receiving yards.

Schedule

References

Kent State
Kent State Golden Flashes football seasons
College football winless seasons
Kent State Golden Flashes football